Deccani (also Dakhini, Dakhni or Dekhani) is anything related to the Deccan region of India. Specifically, it may be:
Deccani language, an Indo-Aryan language spoken in southern India, closely related to Urdu
Deccani Muslims, speakers of Deccani
Deccani film industry, Deccani-language film industry based in Hyderabad, India
Deccani Masnavi, collection of poetry in Deccani
Deccani painting, a style of Indian painting
Architecture of the Deccan sultanates or Deccani architecture, Indian architectural style

See also
Deccan (disambiguation)
Deccan sultanates, sultanates in medieval-India
Hyderabadi Muslims, Muslims from Hyderabad, India and surrounding regions, of which the Deccani Muslims form a sub-group

Language and nationality disambiguation pages